Nika Ožegović (born 21 May 1985) is a former professional tennis player from Croatia. In her career, she won eight ITF tournaments, five in singles and three in doubles. Her career-high WTA rankings are 131 in singles and 193 in doubles.

She retired from professional tennis 2011, and had a comeback in September 2014 for only one ITF tournament in Bol, Croatia.

ITF Circuit finals

Singles (5–6)

Doubles (3–3)

References

External links
 
 

1985 births
Living people
Croatian female tennis players
Tennis players from Zagreb